Moranbah is a coal mining town and locality in the Isaac Region, Queensland, Australia.

In addition to the permanent population, Moranbah also has a large fly-in fly-out population working in Moranbah's mines: in excess of 1,500.

Geography

Moranbah Airport is also on the Moranbah Access Road,  by road of the town.

Climate 
Moranbah experiences a subtropical semi-arid climate (Köppen: BSh, Trewartha: BSal/BShl) with hot summers with moderate precipitation and mild, dry winters.

History
The first European to explore the region was Ludwig Leichhardt in January 1845, and the area was first settled by pastoralists in the 1850s.

Moranbah was established in 1969. The town was rapidly expanded in the late 1970s by the Utah Development Company to house mine workers. It has been featured twice (once in 1977 and again in 2012) on Four Corners, an investigative news program, exploring the effects of Australia's various mining booms on local rural communities.

Moranbah State School opened on 1 January 1971 with a secondary department, which became Moranbah State High School on 25 January 1976. Moranbah East State School opened on 27 January 1981.

Moranbah Post Office opened on 1 March 1971.

In 2011, the Queensland Government's Office of Economic and Statistical Research reported Moranbah as the most expensive place to live in the state of Queensland. The study compared the cost of goods and services such as rent, electricity and household fuels in regional areas, to those in Brisbane and found Moranbah in first place with a housing index at 65 per cent higher than that of Brisbane. Since then, housing prices and accommodation rentals have returned to much more affordable levels.

In 2021, the town celebrated its 50th anniversary with four days of jubilee celebrations, held across the Labour Day long weekend from 30 April 2021 to 3 May 2021. The event had been earlier postponed due to the COVID-19 pandemic.

Economy
Moranbah services the Peak Downs Mine, Goonyella Riverside Mine, Broadmeadow Mine, Moranbah North coal mine, North Goonyella coal mine and several other smaller mines in the region. Although one of the newest towns in the region, its central location and large population has made it the seat of the Isaac Regional Council.

Approximately 100,000 workers have been employed in coal mining over Moranbah's 50-year history.

Education
Moranbah State School is a government primary (Early Childhood-6) school for boys and girls at Belyando Avenue. In 2018, the school had an enrolment of 567 students with 42 teachers (37 full-time equivalent) and 31 non-teaching staff (19 full-time equivalent). It includes a special education program.

Moranbah East State School is a government primary (Prep-6) school for boys and girls at 4 Williams Street. In 2018, the school had an enrolment of 605 students with 35 teachers (34 full-time equivalent) and 30 non-teaching staff (18 full-time equivalent).

Moranbah State High School is a government secondary (7-12) school for boys and girls at Mills Avenue. In 2018, the school had an enrolment of 654 students with 56 teachers (55 full-time equivalent) and 30 non-teaching staff (23 full-time equivalent). It includes a special education program.

Amenities
Moranbah is a thriving community. For a small regional town it offers a diverse range of sports and entertainment facilities including a skate park, library, public swimming pool, soccer, rugby league, golf course, AFL, hockey, tennis, off-road racing, motocross and a BMX club.

Isaac Regional Council operates a public library located at Grosvenor Complex, Batchelor Parade, Town Square.

The Moranbah branch of the Queensland Country Women's Association meets at the QCWA Meeting Room at Town Square.

Churches in the town include:
 Assembly of God ("Oasis Life")
 Uniting Church
 Catholic Church
 Anglican Church
 Christian Fellowship Church
Sporting facilities in the town include:
Rugby Union- Moranbah Bulls who compete in the Mackay Rugby Union competition. 
 Australian rules football - Moranbah Bulldogs.  Established in 1976, the Senior Club boasts 5 Premierships.  In 1977, 1978 and 2014 in the Mackay AFL, and in 1985 and 1986 in the now defunct Central Highlands AFL. The Bulldogs currently participate in the AFL Mackay competition in a 7 club competition and are the most recent Premiers.
Rugby league - the club competes as the Moranbah Miners in the Mackay & District Rugby League competition, fielding teams in three adult grades as well as a number of junior teams in the Mackay Junior League competition. Previously the club competed as the Sharks in the Central Highlands competition against teams from Dysart, Blackwater, Middlemount, Tieri, Emerald, Clermont and Bluff.
Soccer - Moranbah Hawks
Netball
Indoor Volleyball
Squash
Cricket (during summer season)
Social water polo
Touch Football league
Gymnastics
Gun Club
BMX
 Athletics Club
Golf
Crossfit

Notable residents 
The following people were born in, or have lived in, Moranbah:
 Clint Boge – musician
 Josh Hannay (born 1980)  - professional rugby league player; born in Moranbah
 Shane Marteene (born 1977) - professional rugby league player; born in Moranbah
 Larrissa Miller (born 1992) – gymnast, Australian Olympian in 2012 and 2016 ; born in Moranbah
 Travis Norton (born 1976)  - professional rugby league player
 Clinton Schifcofske (born 1975)  - professional rugby league & rugby union player; born in Moranbah
 Dennis Scott (born 1976) – professional rugby league player; born in Moranbah

References

External links

 Moranbah
 Isaac Regional Council
 University of Queensland: Queensland Places: Moranbah

Mining towns in Queensland
Towns in Queensland
Central Queensland
Isaac Region
1969 establishments in Australia
Populated places established in 1969
Localities in Queensland